Prarthana Fardin Dighi (popularly known as Dighi) is a Bangladeshi film actress and model. She won Bangladesh National Film Award for Best Child Artist three times for the films Kabuliwala (2006), Ek Takar Bou (2008), Chachchu Amar Chachchu (2010).

Filmography

Music video

Awards and nominations

References

External links
 
 

Bangladeshi film actresses
Living people
Best Child Artist National Film Award (Bangladesh) winners
2000 births